Marion Morgan ( Swires; born 14 December 1923) was an American vocalist who sang with big band leader Harry James from 1946 to 1949 before embarking on a solo career that flourished throughout the early 1950s.

Career
Morgan was billed as Lee Barrie when she sang on the Pacific Coast. She changed her name at the suggestion of bandleader Russ Morgan.

Radio-TV Mirror magazine reported in its May 1952 issue that Morgan "has been concentrating on night-club dates and has been playing the supper club circuit around the country."

In the 1960s, Morgan was "hostess-singer-interviewer" for the Panorama Pacific program on KNXT in Los Angeles, California.

Personal life 
While performing with Harry James, Marion Morgan fell in love with Sidney J. Beller (1913–1991), the band's road manager, who decided to leave his job just before Morgan left in 1949.   Beller and Morgan were married in Las Vegas on October 7, 1949.  They had two children: Jay Howard Beller, born November 21, 1957, and Julie Lenore Beller.

Selected discography
"White Christmas" - with Harry James (Columbia), 1946
"Heartaches" - with Harry James (Columbia), 1947

References 
General references
 The Complete Encyclopedia of Popular Music and Jazz, 1900-1950, Three volumes, by Roger Davis Kinkle (1916–2000), Arlington House Publishers, New Rochelle, NY (1974) ; ; 

Inline citations

1923 births
Swing singers
American women jazz singers
American jazz singers
American women singer-songwriters
American singer-songwriters
MGM Records artists
Columbia Records artists
Year of death missing